The Bay Ridge and Annapolis Railroad was a 4.5-mile long short line railroad in central Maryland. It ran 4.5 miles from a junction with the Annapolis, Washington and Baltimore Railroad to the resort town of Bay Ridge, Maryland. It mainly provided transportation between Annapolis and the resort, but also connected with a carferry and steamer service to the Eastern Shore. A small connection was eventually made to the Baltimore and Annapolis Short Line. Shortly after opening it fell under the control of the Baltimore and Ohio Railroad. It was never able to make money so it was shut down in 1904 and the tracks were removed in 1918. Almost no sign of it remains today.

History

Origins
The Bay Ridge and Annapolis Railroad was incorporated by the Bay Ridge Company in March 1886. The Bay Ridge Company rebuilt the beach resort on the Chesapeake Bay in 1885. The hotel was doubled in size, the boardwalk expanded, and beach cottages were constructed. The company even opened a zoological exhibit with lions, tigers and bears.

The railroad began operation on July 10, 1886 and for the next 17 years, thousands of people used it to visit the "Queen Resort of the Chesapeake." The start up costs, however, were enormous, and in September 1886, the Bay Ridge Company issued $300,000 worth of bonds. Robert Garrett, President of the Baltimore and Ohio Railroad, bought $150,000 worth of the bonds giving the B&O a controlling interest in the Bay Ridge Company and the Annapolis and Bay Ridge Railroad.

At a point prior to 1890, a small connection was made from Chesapeake Junction to the Baltimore and Annapolis Short Line near West Annapolis.

Carferry connection
For 13 months in 1890-91 the BR&A connected to a carferry and steamer service run by the Baltimore and Eastern Shore Railroad. That service ended in October 1891 and was replaced by a steamer-only operation out of Baltimore.

End of the line
The railroad was never profitable and in 1904 it ceased operations. In 1918, with steel at a premium due to World War I, the tracks were removed.

Stations on the line
 Bay Ridge Junction
 Bay Ridge

Surviving landmarks
 Some right-of-way visible at Bay Ridge Junction and at points in Bay Ridge
 There are no houses on the east side of Amos Garrett Boulevard in Annapolis. The former right-of-way was incorporated into the back yards of the houses on the west side of Archwood Avenue when the railroad was closed. 
 The right-of-way between Spa View Drive and Spa Creek is now Amos Garrett Waterfront Park.
 Cable lines following theright-of-way cross Spa Creek between Amos Garrett Park and Truxton Park.
 The main access road in Truxton Park follows the right-of-way

References

External links
A Brief History of Railroads in Annapolis - The South Shore Line
A Brief History of Railroads in Annapolis - The B&O South Shore Line
Interactive map of the Bay Ridge and Annapolis Railroad between Annapolis and Bay Ridge, Maryland.

Defunct Maryland railroads
Predecessors of the Baltimore and Ohio Railroad
Railway companies established in 1886
Railway companies disestablished in 1904
1886 establishments in Maryland
1904 disestablishments in the United States